Hectogram or hectogramme may refer to:

 a unit of mass
 a 100 sided star polygon